Parascolopsis tanyactis, commonly known as saddled dwarf monocle bream, is a fish native to waters of the Malay Archipelago and the Western Pacific Ocean.

Appearance
Parascolopsis tanyactis has two dark bars on its back, both diffusing out on the lower side, alongside a dark bar across the tail base. The fourth and fifth dorsal rays are also elongated. It can grow to 20 cm in length.

Habitat and Distribution
This bream inhabits offshore trawling grounds within a depth of 45–80 metres.

References 

Nemipteridae
Fish of the Pacific Ocean
Taxa named by Barry C. Russell
Fish of Indonesia
Fish described in 1986